Eastern Street is an early street of Hong Kong, located in the Sai Ying Pun area of Hong Kong Island. Eastern Street North (東邊街北) is an extension of the street leading to the seafront following progressive harbour reclamations.

Eastern Street

The street is part of planned streets in the early development of Victoria City. High Street, Third Street, Second Street and First Street run east to west horizontally on a slight slope while Centre Street, Western Street and Eastern Street run north to south steeply.

The street starts in the Mid-Levels near Bonham Road Government Primary School below Bonham Road and runs down Connaught Road West, crossing High Street, Third Street, Second Street, First Street, Queen's Road Central and Des Voeux Road West.

It descends in the shortest straight line from the mid-levels to the harbour, which explains its slope of 1:6. The steep incline has been cited as a factor in some serious traffic accidents.

Eastern Street North
The extension Eastern Street North (東邊街北), from Connaught Road West, is a continuation of Eastern Street to the Victoria Harbour, Sun Yat Sen Memorial Park and Western Park Indoor Games Hall.

See also
 List of streets and roads in Hong Kong

References
 Hong Kong City Guide 2003, 
 Centamap maps building details
 Hong Kong Yellow Pages map

Sai Ying Pun
Roads on Hong Kong Island